Felipe Garcia Gonçalves (born 6 November 1990), known as Felipe Garcia, is a Brazilian professional footballer who plays as a winger or an attacking midfielder for Operário Ferroviário.

Club career

Næstved
Felipe Garcia was born in Porto Alegre, Rio Grande do Sul, and represented hometown club São José as a youth before moving abroad at early age, joining Danish 1st Division side Næstved Boldklub. After spending the first six months on trial at the under-19s, he signed a three-year contract and made his debut for the club on 4 April 2009, coming on as a second half substitute for Karsten Johansen in a 1–1 home draw against Lyngby BK. Five days later, again from the bench, he scored the equalizer in an away draw against Boldklubben Frem for the same scoreline.

On 25 October 2009 Felipe Garcia scored a brace in a 4–1 home routing of Thisted FC. He repeated the feat on 13 November 2011, in a 2–3 home loss against Esbjerg fB; it was also his last game for the club before leaving in that season's winter transfer window.

Back to Brazil
Felipe García decided to leave Næstved in July 2012, and signed for Aimoré shortly after. The following year he moved to Santo Ângelo, and after six months at the club, joined Pelotas. With the latter, he mainly contributed to their Recopa Gaúcha winning campaign in 2014, scoring twice in a 3–2 success.

Brasil de Pelotas
On 16 April 2014, Felipe Garcia agreed to a contract with Brasil de Pelotas. He achieved back-to-back promotions to Série C (2014) and Série B (2015), being an undisputed starter during both campaigns.

Felipe Garcia made his debut in the second division on 14 May 2016, starting and scoring a double in a 2–0 home win against Paraná. On 16 July he scored another brace, but in a 2–2 home draw against Vila Nova.

Nagoya Grampus
On 30 November 2016, Felipe Garcia signed for Japanese club Nagoya Grampus.

Goiás (loan)
On 30 January 2018, Felipe Garcia joined Goiás on loan until 1 January 2019.

Vitória
Vitória announced on 26 February 2019, that they had signed Garcia.

Career statistics

Honours
Aimoré
Campeonato Gaúcho Série B: 2012

Pelotas
Recopa Gaúcha: 2014

References

External links
Brasil official profile 

1990 births
Living people
Footballers from Porto Alegre
Brazilian footballers
Association football midfielders
Campeonato Brasileiro Série B players
Campeonato Brasileiro Série C players
Campeonato Brasileiro Série D players
Esporte Clube São José players
Næstved Boldklub players
Clube Esportivo Aimoré players
Associação Esportiva e Recreativa Santo Ângelo players
Esporte Clube Pelotas players
Grêmio Esportivo Brasil players
Nagoya Grampus players
Goiás Esporte Clube players
Esporte Clube Vitória players
Brazilian expatriate footballers
Brazilian expatriate sportspeople in Denmark
Expatriate men's footballers in Denmark
Brazilian expatriate sportspeople in Japan
Expatriate footballers in Japan